Heinrich Thun (born 1 September 1938) is an Austrian athlete. He competed in the men's hammer throw at the 1960 Summer Olympics and the 1964 Summer Olympics.

References

1938 births
Living people
Athletes (track and field) at the 1960 Summer Olympics
Athletes (track and field) at the 1964 Summer Olympics
Austrian male hammer throwers
Olympic athletes of Austria
Athletes from Vienna